The Arizona Wildcats baseball team is the intercollegiate men's baseball program representing the University of Arizona in Tucson, Arizona, United States. They compete in the Pac-12 Conference (Pac-12) of NCAA Division I.

Arizona has won four college baseball national championships (1976, 1980, 1986 and 2012), the first three under Jerry Kindall and the most recent under Andy Lopez. The team has appeared in the College World Series Championship Game or Series on four other occasions (1956, 1959, 1963, and 2016). The Wildcats have appeared in 40 baseball tournaments in their rich history. Arizona ranks ninth in all-time wins and 11th in all-time win percentage, with an all-time record of 2,916–1,577–23 as of June 14, 2021. Arizona fielded its first team in 1905.

Venues

Jerry Kindall Field at Frank Sancet Stadium

The former home of Arizona baseball is Jerry Kindall Field at Frank Sancet Stadium. The park is located on the campus of the University of Arizona, adjacent to the McKale Center, home of the UA athletics department. Arizona played its games at the Kindall Field from prior to the 1967 season through the end of the 2011 season. Modernization of the facility was completed for the 1975 season.  Originally called Wildcat Field, the park was officially dedicated Frank Sancet Field on April 19, 1986, in honor of Arizona's longtime head coach. Sancet, who coached from 1950–72, posted an 831–283–8 (.744) mark at the helm of the Cats.

Relocation to Hi Corbett Field
In an effort to have the Wildcat baseball program compete in the best possible facilities, in August 2011, the UA signed an agreement with the city of Tucson for Arizona baseball to play its home games at city-owned Hi Corbett Field, located about three miles southeast of campus, for the 2012 season (beginning with a five-year lease with an option to renew for an additional five years). The UA spent about $350,000 to make several upgrades to the former spring training facility (used as such by the Cleveland Indians and the Colorado Rockies), where the Wildcats previously played selected games in the 1960s and '70s. Through the first three-game series of the 2012 season against North Dakota State, the attendance at the stadium was a total of 8,870, which was nearly 1/4th of the total home attendance for the Wildcats' previous season at Sancet Stadium.

In 2012, the Wildcats posted a 38–17 regular season record (20–10 in Pac-12 conference play), capturing a share of the Pac-12 baseball championship, the school's first league title since 1992. As a result, Hi Corbett Field hosted both an NCAA Regional and Super Regional tournament, and Arizona won both of those to advance to the 2012 College World Series (the program's first postseason appearance in Omaha since 2004) where the team won its fourth national championship. In the 2012 season, the team brought in almost $350,000 in ticket revenue (not including revenue for tickets sold during the NCAA Regional or Super Regional); this is compared to the 2011 season, when Arizona baseball brought in $69,000 worth of ticket revenue in its final season at Sancet Stadium.  The relocation of the Wildcat baseball program to Hi Corbett Field has been noted as a major factor in the team's successful 2012 season.

In March 2017, the University signed a 25-year lease on Hi Corbett Field, taking over the day-to-day management of the baseball stadium from the City of Tucson.

Individual honors

Notable alumni

Brian Anderson – World Series Champion (2005)
Steven Ballard – current Chancellor at East Carolina University
Jett Bandy – catcher, Milwaukee Brewers
Willie Calhoun - San Francisco Giants left fielder
Shelley Duncan – manager of the Hillsboro Hops (minor league affiliate of the Arizona Diamondbacks)
Scott Erickson – All-Star selection (1991), World Series champion (1991).
Terry Francona – 2x World Series champion (2004, 2007) 
Chip Hale – former manager of the Arizona Diamondbacks; named Wildcats head coach in July 2021
Ron Hassey – World Series Champion: 1989, only catcher to catch two perfect games. 
Rich Hinton
Jack Howell
Nick Hundley – current catcher of the San Francisco Giants
Jerry Kindall – member of the American Baseball Coaches Association Hall of Fame.
 Scott Kingery (born 1994) – Major League Baseball player for the Philadelphia Phillies
Don Lee – spent 9 years in the majors with 6 different teams.
Hank Leiber – 1-time All-Star (1938) spent 10 years in the majors for the Chicago Cubs and San Francisco Giants.
Mike Paul
Dan Schneider
Ed Vosberg – World Series Champion (1997)
Eddie Leon
Kenny Lofton – 6-time All-Star (1994–99), 4-time Gold Glove Award (1993–96). 
Trevor Hoffman – 2nd all-time Major League saves holder with 601 total saves, 7x All-Star (1998–2000, 2002, 2006–2007, 2009), Baseball Hall of Fame inductee, 2017.
J. T. Snow – 6x Gold Glove Award winner (1995, 1996, 1997, 1998, 1999, 2000) 
Joe Magrane – led the NL in ERA in 1988 with 2.18.
Dave Stegman
Craig Lefferts – ranks 76th on the MLB All-Time Games Pitched List (696).
Brad Mills – 2x World Series Champion (2004, 2007)
Dan Meyer
Mark Melancon- current pitcher for the San Diego Padres 
Ryan Perry
Kevin Long – current hitting coach of the Washington Nationals
Rob Refsnyder – utility player for the Boston Red Sox. 2012 College World Series champion and Most Outstanding Player.

Retired jerseys
Student-Athlete jerseys are retired but not individual player numbers.

Rivalries

Arizona State
Arizona’s main rival is Arizona State. Although they are famously known for their rivalry in football and basketball as well as softball, both schools have had a rich baseball tradition in their history. The Wildcats lead the Sun Devils in all time baseball series 255–221–1 as of May 2021 and both teams have had several players drafted into MLB. 

In recent years, Arizona has had an edge over Arizona State in college baseball success. In 2010 ASU won the Pac-10 and also advanced to the College World Series, capping the end of a dominating run of 4 straight Pac-10 conference championships and 3 CWS appearances in 4 years (missed CWS in 2008). Later, the NCAA would vacate the 2007 Pac-10 Championship and 2007 CWS appearance from ASU's record. 

Since then Arizona has won the CWS (2012), was the CWS runner-up (2016) and won the Pac-12 Championship (2021). In contrast to Arizona's recent success, ASU has not won the Pac-10/12 Conference since 2010, has not been the CWS runner up since 1988 and has not won a NCAA Championship since 1981. Arizona has won 2 NCAA championships since 1981. While ASU still has a more robust historical record (5x NCAA Champs, 1965, 1967, 1969, 1977, 1981 and 21x CWS appearances), Arizona has narrowed that gap in the last 10 years.

See also
List of NCAA Division I baseball programs
1976 College World Series
1980 College World Series
1986 College World Series
2004 College World Series
2012 College World Series
2016 College World Series

References

External links